Redcode may refer to:
 The programming language used in the simulation game Core War
 REDCODE, a video codec used in RED Digital Cinema cameras

See also
 Code Red (disambiguation)